Teushpa (Akkadian:  , and  ) was an early 7th-century BC king of the Cimmerians.

Name

Askold Ivantchik instead posits three alternative suggestions for an Old Iranian origin of :
 "abductor of horses"
 "abductor dog"
 "divine dog"

Despite the similarity of 's name with that of his Persian contemporary , they do not seem to be etymologically related.

Historical background

In the 8th and 7th centuries BCE, a significant movement of the nomads of the Eurasian steppe brought the Scythians into Southwest Asia. According to Herodotus, this movement started when the Massagetae or the Issedones migrated westwards, forcing the Scythians to the west across the Araxes and into the Caspian Steppe, from where they displaced the Cimmerians.

Reign
Around 680 BCE, the Cimmerians separated into two groups, with their bulk having migrated into Anatolia, while a smaller group remained in the area near the kingdom of Mannai and later migrated into Media.

Teušpa was the king of the western Cimmerian horde, who had moved into Anatolia. In 679 BCE, Teušpa led a Cimmerian incursion against the western borderlands of the Neo-Assyrian Empire and was defeated and killed by the Assyrian king Esarhaddon near Ḫubušna in Cappadocia. Despite this victory, the military operations of the Assyrians were not fully successful and they were not able to firmly occupy the areas around Ḫubušna, nor were they able to secure their borders.

References

Sources

 
 
 
 

Medes
Cimmerian rulers
7th-century BC rulers